Ratchford is an unincorporated community in Milton Township, Jackson County, Ohio, United States.

The Ratchford Post Office was established on March 15, 1900 and discontinued on March 15, 1907.  Mail service is now handled through the Wellston branch.

References 

Unincorporated communities in Jackson County, Ohio